The third election to Pembrokeshire County Council was held in March 1895.  It was preceded by the 1892 election and followed by the 1898 election.

Overview of the result

In 1895 there were fewer uncontested returns than at the previous election in 1892, as the Conservatives launched a determined effort to take control of the county council. This resulted in substantial gains at the expense of the Liberals.

Boundary changes
There were no boundary changes at this election.

Results

Ambleston

Amroth

Begelly

Burton

Camrose

Carew
The result did not appear in the local press but Lort Phillips was said to have been returned by a 'good majority'.

Clydey

Castlemartin

Eglwyswrw

Fishguard

Haverfordwest St Martin's Hamlets

Haverfordwest, Prendergast and Uzmaston
The mayor, as returning officer, gave his casting vote in favour of the Liberal candidate.

Haverfordwest, St Thomas and Furzy Park

Haverfordwest St Martin's and St Mary's

Kilgerran

Lampeter Velfrey

Llanfyrnach

Llanwnda

Llangwm
Carrow appears to have been elected as a Liberal in 1892.

Llanstadwell

Llawhaden

Maenclochog

Manorbier

Mathry

Milford
Dr Griffith had stood as a Liberal in 1892

Monkton

Narberth North

Nevern

Newport

Pembroke Ward 30

Pembroke Ward 31

Pembroke Dock Ward 32

Pembroke Dock Ward 33

Pembroke Dock Ward 34
Stamper stood as a Liberal Unionist in 1892.

Pembroke Dock Ward 35

Pembroke Dock Ward 36

St David's

St Dogmaels

St Ishmaels

St Issels

Slebech and Martletwy

Steynton

Tenby Ward 44

Tenby Ward 45

Walwyn's Castle

Whitchurch

Wiston

Election of aldermen
The election of aldermen reflected Conservative successes at the election.

References

1895
19th century in Pembrokeshire
1895 Welsh local elections